Anabel Medina Garrigues and Yaroslava Shvedova were the two-time defending champions, but chose not to participate this year.
Annika Beck and Laura Siegemund won the title, defeating María Irigoyen and Paula Kania in the final, 6–3, 7–6(7–1).

Seeds

Draw

References 
 Main Draw

Brasil Tennis Cup - Doubles
2015 Doubles